Miss America's Outstanding Teen 2017 was the 11th Miss America's Outstanding Teen pageant held at Linda Chapin Theatre in the Orange County Convention Center in Orlando, Florida on August 6, 2016. Allie Nault of New Hampshire crowned her successor Nicole Jia of Oklahoma at the end of the program.

Results summary

Placement 

§ America's Choice

Order of announcements

Top 11

Top 5

Awards

Preliminary awards

Talent awards

Other awards

Contestants 
Miss America's Outstanding Teen 2017 contestants are:

References 

2017
2017 in Florida
2017 beauty pageants